This is a list of years in Morocco. For only articles about years in Morocco that have been written, see Category:Years in Morocco.

16th century

17th century

18th century

19th century

20th century

21st century

See also
 List of years by country

Cities in Morocco
 Timeline of Casablanca
 Timeline of Fes
 Timeline of Marrakesh
 Timeline of Rabat
 Timeline of Tangier

Further reading

External links
 
 

 
Morocco history-related lists
Morocco